The , Panulirus japonicus, is a member of the genus Panulirus of spiny lobsters. P. japonicus is the subject of commercial lobster fishery in Japan. It is a popular item in high-class Japanese cuisine. Serving and preparation methods include sashimi, as a steak, frying, and roasting alive (zankoku-yaki).

References

Achelata
Edible crustaceans
Commercial crustaceans
Crustaceans described in 1824